Mary II, Countess of Menteith was a Scottish noblewoman.  Her father was Alan II, Earl of Menteith, who died c. 1330.  She is believed to have agreed with her kinsman Muireadhach III, in 1330, that he should hold the Earldom, but when he was killed in August 1332, Mary assumed the title.  She married Sir John Graham (d. 28 February 1347), who in her right became Earl of Monteith and assumed the title in May 1346. She died sometime prior to 29 April 1360.  She was the mother of Margaret Graham, Countess of Menteith.

References

Year of birth unknown
14th-century deaths
Mormaers of Menteith
14th-century Scottish earls